Martin Klarer (born 19 April 1982) is a German footballer who plays as a midfielder for SC Staig, where he is also the manager.

Playing career
Klarer made his professional debut in the 3. Liga for 1. FC Heidenheim on 25 July 2009, starting in the home match against Wuppertaler SV, which finished as a 2–2 draw.

Managerial career
Klarer was the assistant manager for 1. FC Heidenheim II in the Oberliga Baden-Württemberg during the 2013–14 season. In 2017, he was appointed as the head coach of SC Staig, where he acts as a player-manager.

References

External links
 Profile at DFB.de
 Profile at kicker.de
 SC Staig statistics at Fussball.de

1982 births
Living people
Sportspeople from Ulm
Footballers from Baden-Württemberg
German footballers
Association football midfielders
1. FC Nürnberg II players
FC Ingolstadt 04 players
1. FC Heidenheim players
3. Liga players
Regionalliga players
German football managers
FC Ingolstadt 04 II players